Shi Yuqi (born 28 February 1996) is a Chinese badminton player. Shi Yuqi won his first Superseries title in the 2016 French Open. At the 2017 All England Open, he defeated 6-time champion Lin Dan to reach the final, and repeated the same feat again at the 2018 All England Open, where he outclassed Lin Dan in the tournament final.

Early life 
Shi was born on 28 February 1996, in Nantong City, Jiangsu Province to parents Shi Lei and Fang Fang. He started playing badminton at age six when he entered a junior sports school in the city to practice badminton. In 2007, Shi went to Singapore to study as well as play badminton. He enrolled in Yu Neng Primary School and trained at the Singapore Badminton School under ex-SBA chief coach Zhang Qing Song. In 2009, he returned to China after the global financial crisis.

In 2011, Shi won first place in the Jiangsu Province youth badminton competition. Thereafter, he successfully entered the Jiangsu Province badminton team and became a professional badminton player. In 2012, he participated in the National Youth Championship for the first time and won the championship. At the age of 16, he was selected for the national badminton team.

Career

2012–2015: Youth Olympics gold and Asian Junior Champion
In 2012, Shi participated in his first Asian Junior Championships and came in second in the mixed team event after China lost 0–3 to Japan in the final. In the boys' singles event, he lost to C. Rohit Yadav of India in the round of 32 after a three games battle that lasted for 65 mins. In the 2013 edition of the Asian Junior Badminton Championships, Shi, as a member of the Chinese team, came in first in the mixed team event, beating South Korea 3–1 in the final. He competed at the Asian Youth Games, winning the bronze medals in the boys' singles and mixed doubles partnered with Chen Yufei. Later that year, Shi made his senior international debut at the Korea Grand Prix Gold where he would lose in the first round to South Korea's Hong Ji-hoon in two straight games after advancing from the qualifiers.

In 2014, Shi had the first breakthrough of his fledgling career. He won both the mixed team and boys' singles titles at the Asian Junior Badminton Championships. He first helped China defend its mixed team title by sweeping South Korea 3–0 in the final. In the boys' singles event that follow, he advanced to the final where he defeated Kanta Tsuneyama of Japan in three games 19–21, 21–16, 21–16 to win the title. Shi then followed up with another mixed team success at the World Junior Championships, where China defeated Indonesia 3–0 in the final. He also won a silver medal in the boys' singles event after losing to his compatriot Lin Guipu in the final. In August, at the Youth Olympic Games, he won the boys' singles gold after avenging his defeat to Lin Guipu at the World Junior Championships final by beating him 21–15, 21–19 this time. Shi, however, did not have a good year in 2015, his best showing was at the China Open, where he reached the quarter-finals of the tournament, losing to Son Wan-ho of South Korea in three games.

2016: Three tour titles
In 2016, Shi became a first-line player on the Chinese badminton team. He started the season poorly though, reaching only the semi-finals of the Syed Modi International in his first eight-month on tour. However, his form improved later in the year and he won his first senior title on tour by winning the Indonesia Masters after his compatriot Huang Yuxiang retired in the second game of the final with Shi leading 21–12, 11–0. He followed up from his success by winning the French Open next, beating Lee Hyun-il of South Korea in two straight games 21–16, 21–19. Shi then continued his rich veins of form by winning the Bitburger Open, beating India's Sourabh Varma 21–19, 22–20 in the final.

2017: All England finalist and Asian Championships bronze
Shi continued his good form into 2017. He started the season by winning a bronze medal in the Asia Mixed Team Championships where China lost to the eventual winner Japan 1–3 in the semi-finals. In March, he reached the final of the All England Open by beating his senior Lin Dan in the semi-finals. He, however, would lose in the final to Malaysia's Lee Chong Wei in two straight games 12–21, 10–21. Shi reached another final at the Swiss Open, but lost tamely to Lin Dan in the final this time around. In April, he competed in the Asian Championships and finished with a bronze medal after losing to compatriot Chen Long 19–21, 15–21 in the semi-finals. In August, Shi participated in his maiden World Championships but was knocked out by Hong Kong's Wong Wing Ki in the third round. At the year-end World Superseries Finals, he lost in the semi-finals to Viktor Axelsen of Denmark 12–21, 8–21.

2018: First All England and World Tour Finals titles, Thomas Cup and Asian Games Team Champions, World Championships silver
2018 was probably Shi's best season to date. He began by winning the India Open in January, beating Chou Tien-chen of Chinese Tapei in two straight games. In February, he won a silver medal in the Asia Team Championships after China lost to Indonesia 1–3 in the final. He started March by reaching the semi-finals of the German Open where he lost to Ng Ka Long of Hong Kong in three tightly contested games. He then competed at the All England and won the crown, defeating Lin Dan in the final, with the scoreline of 21–19, 16–21, 21–9. It was his biggest ever individual title on tour and his first Super 1000 title. In May, Shi was selected to represent the Chinese team in the Thomas Cup and he did not disappoint, winning the crucial men's singles tie against Kenta Nishimoto in the final, to help his team to a 3–1 victory over Japan. In July, he participated in his second World Championships and made it all the way to the final where he lost to Japan's Kento Momota, thus finishing with a silver medal, which is his best showing in the tournament thus far. In August, Shi participated in the Asian Games men's team event where China claimed the gold medal for a record sixth time after defeating Indonesia 3–1 in the final. In October, he reached his second French Open final but was defeated by Chen Long in two straight games. At the year-end tourney, Shi avenged his defeat at the World Championships by beating Kento Momota 21–12, 21–11 to win his first World Tour Final title.

2019: Sudirman Cup Champion, Asian Championships silver and First Swiss Open title
Shi's first tournament of the season was at the Malaysia Masters where he reached the quarter-finals but was defeated by Malaysia's Daren Liew in three games. In March, his quest to defend his All England title was thwarted by Viktor Axelsen after losing to him in the semi-finals. Shi then bounces back quickly from his disappointment by winning the next tournament, the Swiss Open. There, he defeated B. Sai Praneeth in three games, 19–21, 21–18, 21–12, to win his first Swiss Open title. In April, he competed at the Malaysia Open but lost to Lin Dan in the semi-finals. He then participated in the Asian Championships held in Wuhan, China, where he finished with a silver medal, after losing to Kento Momota in the final. In May, at the Sudirman Cup, Shi helped the Chinese team to win their eleventh title after he completes a stunning comeback over World No.1 Kento Momota to clinch China three-game sweep of Japan. In July, Shi participated in the Indonesia Open where he suffered a horrible ankle injury in a match with Anders Antonsen and had to retire. For the rest of the year, Shi did not perform well, he only reached the final of the Macau Open, where he lost to Thailand's Sitthikom Thammasin 21–12, 14–21, 7–21.

2020: All England quarter-finalist
Shi had a hectic start to the 2020 season where he participated in three straight tournaments in January to begin the season. He reached the quarter-finals of both the Malaysia Masters and Indonesia Masters where he lost to Malaysia's Lee Zii Jia and  Hong Kong's Lee Cheuk Yiu respectively. The following week, at the Thailand Masters, Shi managed to reach the semi-finals where he would lose to Ng Ka Long 18–21, 19–21. In March, he competed in the All England Open, but was defeated by Viktor Axelsen again albeit, in the quarter-finals this time. This will turn out to be his final tournament of the year as the rest of the tourneys were mostly canceled after the COVID-19 outbreak.

2021: Second Sudirman Cup and First National title
In 2021, Shi competed in only four tournaments, namely the delayed Tokyo Olympics in July, the Chinese National Championships and the Sudirman Cup in September, and the delayed Thomas Cup in October. In the Tokyo Olympics, Shi cleared the group stage easily and met Jonatan Christie of Indonesia in the knockout round where, he had no problem dispatching, beating him 21–11, 21–9. In the quarter-final, he faced Viktor Axelsen again and lost 13–21, 13–21, thus ending his Olympics campaign. In the Chinese National Championships, he finally claimed his first national title after beating Jiangsu teammate Lu Guangzu, 21–9, 21–13 in the final. In the Sudirman Cup, Shi performed well, helping China defend its title from 2019 against rivals Japan in a 3–1 victory. In the Thomas Cup, China reached the final but lost to Indonesia 3–0. He did not play in the final.

Controversy
Shi played as the first men's singles against Kento Momota of Japan at the 2020 Thomas Cup semi-finals in Aarhus, Denmark. Shi lost the first set 22–20, and retired in the second just as Momota was about to serve at 20–5. This “bizarre” retreat caused some controversy. Shi later cited injuries and tiredness for his withdrawal in a social media post, citing that since he withdrew when the opponent was at 20 points, he has not recorded a loss because it was not at 21. However, that did little to quell netizens' anger, with people calling him out for his unsportsmanlike behavior.

Suspension
In an interview before the 2022 Thomas Cup Finals, the president of the Chinese Badminton Association, Zhang Jun confirmed that after an internal review, Shi has been suspended from the national team and barred from playing in any international tournaments for one year. The internal ban was due to the infamous incident from the 2021 Thomas Cup competition and the immature comments that he said after the match.

2022: Strong return, two tour titles 
At the 2022 BWF World Championships held in Tokyo, Japan, Shi returned to action for the first time in 10 months after serving a ban and beat Azerbaijan's Ade Resky Dwicahyo 22–20, 21–10, Denmark's Rasmus Gemke 21–13, 21–16 in the first two round but lost out for a place in the quarter-finals after losing to Indonesia's Anthony Sinisuka Ginting, in the third round, with a scoreline of 11–21, 21–13, 18–21. The following week, he participated at the Japan Open and played well, reaching the semi-finals where he would lose to Chinese Tapei's Chou Tien-chen in another three set battle, 21–15, 19–21, 12–21. In October, at the Denmark Open, Shi had his best showing of the season when he defeated Malaysia's Lee Zii Jia in a thrilling three setters, 21–18, 16–21, 21–12 to clinch his maiden Danish title and his first world tour title in three years. After his success in Denmark, Shi would struggle to replicate his best form in the next two tournaments that he competed in. At the French Open, he lost in the first round to Thailand's Sitthikom Thammasin, 16–21, 14–21 and followed that up with yet another first round defeat to Singapore's Loh Kean Yew, 5–21, 20–22 at the Hylo Open in Germany. He then finished the season strongly by winning the Australian Open title after defeating his fellow countryman Lu Guangzu, 21–19, 18–21, 21–5. He is the only men's singles player beside Viktor Axelsen and Anthony Sinisuka Ginting who had won 2 or more BWF Tour titles in 2022 despite participating in only 6 competitions this year.

2023 
On 18 March 2023 at the prestigious All England Open, Shi Yuqi beat Malaysia's Lee Zii Jia 21-19, 21-13, in straight sets. He reached the final once again, before losing 24-26, and 21-5 to his fellow countryman Li Shifeng.

Achievements

BWF World Championships 
Men's singles

Asian Championships 
Men's singles

Youth Olympic Games 
Boys' singles

BWF World Junior Championships 
Boys' singles

Asian Youth Games 
Boys' singles

Mixed doubles

Asian Junior Championships 
Boys' singles

BWF World Tour (6 titles, 3 runners-up) 
The BWF World Tour, which was announced on 19 March 2017 and implemented in 2018, is a series of elite badminton tournaments sanctioned by the Badminton World Federation (BWF). The BWF World Tour is divided into levels of World Tour Finals, Super 1000, Super 750, Super 500, Super 300 (part of the HSBC World Tour), and the BWF Tour Super 100.

Men's singles

BWF Superseries (1 title, 1 runner-up) 
The BWF Superseries, which was launched on 14 December 2006 and implemented in 2007, was a series of elite badminton tournaments, sanctioned by the Badminton World Federation (BWF). BWF Superseries levels were Superseries and Superseries Premier. A season of Superseries consisted of twelve tournaments around the world that had been introduced since 2011. Successful players were invited to the Superseries Finals, which were held at the end of each year.

Men's singles

  BWF Superseries Finals tournament
  BWF Superseries Premier tournament
  BWF Superseries tournament

BWF Grand Prix (2 titles, 1 runner-up) 
The BWF Grand Prix had two levels, the Grand Prix and Grand Prix Gold. It was a series of badminton tournaments sanctioned by the Badminton World Federation (BWF) and played between 2007 and 2017.

Men's singles

  BWF Grand Prix Gold tournament
  BWF Grand Prix tournament

Record against selected opponents 
Record against Year-end Finals finalists, World Championships semi-finalists, and Olympic quarter-finalists. Accurate as of 21 November 2022.

References

External links 

1996 births
Living people
Sportspeople from Nantong
Badminton players from Jiangsu
Chinese male badminton players
Badminton players at the 2014 Summer Youth Olympics
Youth Olympic gold medalists for China
Badminton players at the 2020 Summer Olympics
Olympic badminton players of China
Badminton players at the 2018 Asian Games
Asian Games gold medalists for China
Asian Games medalists in badminton
Medalists at the 2018 Asian Games
Nanjing Sport Institute alumni